Trioceros perreti, Perret's chameleon or Perret's montane chameleon, is a species of chameleon found in Cameroon.

References

Trioceros
Reptiles described in 1992
Taxa named by Wolfgang Böhme (herpetologist)
Reptiles of Cameroon